This was the first edition of the tournament.

Carlos Taberner won the title after defeating Mathias Bourgue 6–4, 7–6(7–4) in the final.

Seeds

Draw

Finals

Top half

Bottom half

References

External links
Main draw
Qualifying draw

Iași Open - Singles